Niko Mario Patrick Kirwan (born 4 September 1995) is a New Zealand  professional footballer who plays as a midfielder for Italian  club Padova and the New Zealand national team.

Club career

Team Wellington
Kirwan signed to play for Team Wellington in the New Zealand Football Championship for the 2016–2017 season.

Mestre
On the 28 July 2017, Kirwan signed a one-year deal with Mestre who play in the Italian Serie C.

Reggina
On 8 July 2018, Kirwan signed a one-year deal with an option for another two with Reggina who play in the Italian Serie C.

Reggiana
On 16 August 2019, he signed a 2-year contract with Reggiana.

Padova
Kirwan signed with Serie C side Padova in 2021.

International career
On the 15 March 2018, Kirwan was called up for the New Zealand national football team as part of its 24-man squad for their friendly against Canada.

He made his international debut with New Zealand in a 2–1 friendly win over Curaçao on 9 October 2021. He scored his first international goal three days later, a late winner against Bahrain.

International goals

Personal life
Kirwan is the son of New Zealand All Black  Sir John Kirwan. He lived in Italy for 10 years which is where he got his love of football from and learnt Italian. He is of Italian descent through his mother Fiorella. He also holds Italian citizenship.

Honours

Club
Team Wellington
 New Zealand Football Championship Premiers: 2016–17
 OFC Champions League Runner Up: 2017

References

External links

1995 births
Living people
Association footballers from Auckland
New Zealand people of Italian descent
New Zealand association footballers
Association football midfielders
New Zealand Football Championship players
Team Wellington players
Serie B players
Serie C players
A.C. Mestre players
Reggina 1914 players
A.C. Reggiana 1919 players
Calcio Padova players
New Zealand expatriate association footballers
New Zealand expatriate sportspeople in Italy
Expatriate footballers in Italy
People educated at Sacred Heart College, Auckland
New Zealand international footballers